Afroedura pundomontana, also known as the Bocoio flat gecko,  is a species of African geckos, first found in Namibia.

References

Afroedura
Reptiles of Angola
Endemic fauna of Angola
Reptiles described in 2022